Sambikerep is a district in Surabaya, East Java, Indonesia.

Geography
Sambikerep is a part of Surabaya.

Populated places in East Java
Districts of East Java